FK Tiverija is a football club based in the city of Strumica, North Macedonia. They are currently competing in the Macedonian Third League (East Division).

History
The club was founded in 1923.

References

External links
Club info at MacedonianFootball 
Football Federation of Macedonia 

FK
Football clubs in North Macedonia
Association football clubs established in 1923
1923 establishments in Yugoslavia